Vaucelles is a railway station located in the commune of Taverny (Val-d'Oise department), France. The station is served by Transilien H trains, on the line from Paris to Persan-Beaumont. The daily number of passengers was between 500 and 2,500 in 2002. Vaucelles is located on the line from Ermont-Eaubonne to Valmondois, that was opened in 1876. The line was electrified in 1970. The station was renovated in 2009.

Gallery

See also
 List of SNCF stations in Île-de-France

References

External links

 

Railway stations in Val-d'Oise
Railway stations in France opened in 1876